Cannon Mountain or Mount Cannon may refer to:

Cannon Mountain (New Hampshire) 
 Cannon Mountain Ski Area, a ski resort on that mountain
Cannon Mountain (Washington)  
Mount Cannon in Montana

See also
 Mount Kannon in Hokkaido, Japan
 Mount Kannon, a peak of Mount Hōō in Honshū, Japan